Hallel ("Praise") is a Jewish prayer, a verbatim recitation from Psalms  which is recited by observant Jews on Jewish holidays as an act of praise and thanksgiving.

Holy days
Hallel consists of six Psalms (113–118), which are recited as a unit, on joyous occasions  including the Three Pilgrimage Festivals mentioned in the Torah,  Passover (Pesach), Shavuot, and Sukkot, as well as at Hanukkah and Rosh Chodesh (beginning of the new month).

Hallel is recited during the evening prayers on the first (and, outside Israel, second) night of Pesach, except by Lithuanian and German Jews, and by all communities during the Passover Seder service. According to the Talmud, there was a dispute between the school of Hillel and the school of Shammai regarding the reading of Hallel on Pesach. According to the school of Shammai, only the first psalm (Ps. 113) should be read before the meal, whereas the school of Hillel advocated reading the first two psalms (Ps. 113 and 114). The remaining Psalms would be said after the Grace After Meals (as is usually the case, the halacha follows the school of Hillel).

Although Hallel generally refers only to the aforementioned psalms, the Talmud also refers to Psalm 136 as "the Great Hallel". Each verse of Psalm 136 concludes with the refrain "for his mercy endures forever" and it contains mention of twenty-six acts of Divine kindness and sustenance for the world. It is recited at the Pesach Seder after the standard Hallel is completed. It is also said in the expanded Pesukei dezimra on the morning of Shabbat and festivals. In the Talmudic era, if rain fell on the morning of a fast day that was declared in response to a drought, this was seen as a sign of Divine favor, in which case "the Great Hallel" was added in the afternoon prayers. There is mention in some references that this Psalm may also be used antiphonally in Temple worship.

On Rosh Hashanah and Yom Kippur, Hallel is not said at all, because as the Talmud states (Arachin 10b): "Is it seemly for the king to be sitting on His Throne of Judgment, with the Books of Life and Death open before Him, and for the people to sing joyful praises to Him?"

Pesach, like Sukkot, has the structure of "main holiday", followed by "Intermediate Days" (Chol HaMoed), followed by "main holiday". Since Pesach involved only a partial redemption of the Jews and the destruction of Egypt, and as the same sacrifice was offered in the Temple on every day of the holiday (as opposed to Sukkot), only "Half" (or Partial) Hallel is recited on all of the last six days of Pesach. Full Hallel is recited for the entirety of Sukkot.

Partial Hallel is recited on Rosh Chodesh because it was introduced at a much later time than the major holidays.

No Hallel, neither "Full" nor "Partial", is recited on Purim, despite the fact that there was a miraculous salvation, for several reasons:
 The miracle did not occur in the Land of Israel and, for "lesser" holidays, only those occurring in Israel merit the recitation of Hallel.
 Even after the Miracle of Purim, the Jews remained subjects of the Persian Empire, whereas on Hanukkah, as a result of the victory of the Maccabees, the Jews gained their independence from the Seleucid kings.
 Reading the Megilla (Book of Esther) is a substitute for Hallel.

Full Hallel
Full Hallel consists of all six Psalms of the Hallel, in their entirety. It is a Jewish prayer recited on the first two nights and days of Pesach (only the first night and day in Israel), on Shavuot, all seven days of Sukkot, on Shemini Atzeret and Simchat Torah, and on the eight days of Hanukkah. The sages have provided a "siman" (a way to remember) the days when full Hallel is recited. It is called "BeBeTaCh".

Full Hallel consists of Psalm 113, Psalm 114, Psalm 115:1–11,12–18, Psalm 116:1–11,12–19, Psalm 117, Psalm 118.

Psalm 136 was most probably used antiphonally in Temple worship. In Jewish liturgy, the Great Hallel is recited at the Pesach Seder after the Lesser Hallel. All through the refrain is a repeated reference to the Lord's steadfast love (see ). This psalm is a hymn that opens with a call to praise God because of God's great deeds in nature and God's gracious historical actions in the history of Israel. It continues expressing God's mercy toward all and ends with another call to praise God.

A blessing is recited at the beginning and end of Full Hallel.

Partial Hallel
Partial Hallel omits parts of the Full Hallel: The first eleven verses of Psalms 115 and 116 are omitted. It is recited on the last six days of Pesach and on Rosh Chodesh.

New Testament
The New Testament accounts of the Last Supper state that Jesus and his disciples "sang a psalm" or "hymn" after the meal before leaving for the Mount of Olives, which may have been the Hallel. The Last Supper is popularly considered to have been a celebration of the Passover, although this is controversial among scholars.  Jesus, like any other literate Jew in the first century, may well have known how to chant the Psalms in Hebrew, especially the famous Hallel psalms which were an integral part of the Passover.

Musical settings
In the Jewish tradition, there are well established and various melodies for the singing of Hallel. Some of the psalms are sung while others are recited silently or under the breath.

Other Hallel sequences
The name "Hallel" is normally applied to Psalms 113–118. For greater specificity this is sometimes called the Egyptian Hallel.

The term Great Hallel is used to refer to Psalm 136; according to other opinions in the Talmud, Great Hallel refers to either Psalms 135-136 or 134-136.

Pesukei dezimra is also described by the Talmud as a kind of Hallel.

Other Hallel times
Many Jewish communities, especially those which identify with religious Zionism, recite Hallel on Yom Ha'atzmaut (Israeli Independence Day) and some also recite it on Yom Yerushalayim (the day commemorating the reunification of Jerusalem in 1967). The Chief Rabbinate of Israel instructs Jews to recite Hallel during Yom Ha'atzmaut. On those occasions, Hallel is usually chanted aloud as part of Shacharit (the morning prayer service) following the Shacharit's Shemoneh Esreh ("The Eighteen", the main prayer).

See also
 Biblical poetry
 Day to Praise
 Hallelujah
 List of Jewish prayers and blessings
 Takbir

References

Further reading
 Cup of Salvation: A Powerful Journey Through King David's Psalms of Praise by Rabbi Pesach Wolicki (Center for Jewish–Christian Understanding and Cooperation, Gefen Publishing, 2017) 
 Anthems for a Dying Lamb: How Six Psalms (113-118) Became a Songbook for the Last Supper and the Age to Come by Philip S. Ross (Fearn, Christian Focus Publications, 2017)

External links 

 
 The Open Siddur Project: Hallel
 Sefaria.org: Hallel
 

 
Hebrew words and phrases in Jewish prayers and blessings
Hebrew words and phrases in the Hebrew Bible